Stratford by-election may refer to:

Stratford, Taranaki, New Zealand
 1920 Stratford by-election, following the invalidation of the 1919 election

Stratford-on-Avon, England
 1901 Stratford-on-Avon by-election, following the death of Victor Milward
 1909 Stratford-on-Avon by-election, following the resignation of Thomas Kincaid-Smith to restand as an independent
 1963 Stratford by-election, following the Profumo affair